The 1990 BP National Championships was a men's tennis tournament played on outdoor hard courts in Wellington in New Zealand and was part of the World Series of the 1990 ATP Tour. It was the third edition of the tournament and ran from 1 January through 7 January 1990. First-seeded Emilio Sánchez won the singles title.

Finals

Singles

 Emilio Sánchez defeated  Richey Reneberg 6–7(3–7), 6–4, 4–6, 6–4, 6–1
 It was Sánchez's 1st title of the year and the 37th of his career.

Doubles

 Kelly Evernden /  Nicolás Pereira defeated  Sergio Casal /  Emilio Sánchez 6–4, 7–6
 It was Evernden's only title of the year and the 8th of his career. It was Pereira's only title of the year and the 1st of his career.

See also
 1990 Fernleaf International Classic – women's tournament

References

External links
 ITF tournament edition details

BP National Championships
BP National Championships
January 1990 sports events in New Zealand
1990s in Wellington
BP